Sulbiate is a comune (municipality) in the Province of Monza and Brianza in the Italian region Lombardy, located about  northeast of Milan.

Main sights
Church of Sant'Antonino
Church of Sant'Ambrogio
Church of San Pietro Apostolo
Lampugnani  Castle
Villa Baraggia

References

External links